Frobisher may refer to:

People
 Frobisher (surname), a surname shared by several real and fictional people

Places
 Frobisher, Saskatchewan
 Frobisher Bay, a bay in Baffin Island, named after Martin Frobisher
 Frobisher Bay, the former name of a town in Baffin Island, Canada, now known as Iqaluit
 Frobisher Lake, a lake in central Saskatchewan

Other uses
 Frobisher (Doctor Who), a character from the comic strips based on the television series Doctor Who
 Robert Frobisher, a character from David Mitchell's novel Cloud Atlas
 HMS Frobisher, two ships of the Royal Navy
 Frobisher Says, a video game